Golf at the 2015 Island Games took place between 30 June and 3 July at La Moye Golf Club and Royal Jersey Golf Club,  Jersey.

Medal Table

Results

References 

Island
2015
2015 Island Games